All We Know of Heaven, All We Need of Hell is the second album by American rock band Pvris. It was released August 25, 2017. The first single "Heaven" was released April 30, 2017.

Background and recording
On July 27, 2016, Lynn Gunn posted a photo on her Twitter showing 45 songs that had been written for the band's second album. Pvris played their last show of 2016 at Summer Sonic Osaka on August 21. After this they went to the city of Utica in upstate New York to record their second album in a supposedly haunted church turned record studio.

Sessions were held at Big Blue North in Utica, New York and Songboi Studios in Brooklyn, New York, with producer Blake Harnage, who also acts as engineer, and additional production from Gunn. Anthony Reeder did engineering and editing, while Jef Moll engineered the drums Mark "Spike" Stent mixed "Heaven", "Half", "What's Wrong" and "Winter" with assistant Michael Freeman at The Mix Suite LA. Rich Costey mixed "Anyone Else", "Walk Alone", "No Mercy", "Separate" and "Nola 1", while Jeff Juliano mixed "Same Soul", before the album was mastered by Chris Athens. On February 13, 2017, Pvris confirmed on a post on their Facebook page that the album was done being recorded.

Release
On February 17, 2017, Pvris updated all of their social media platforms with a new theme as well as a post with the roman numerals "II XX XVII" or 2 20 17. On February 20 they announced a small European tour. Lynn Gunn then proceeded to tweet out, "Oh my loves, can't you see? The new era has just begun." She also confirmed that fans would get to hear some new songs on the European tour. On May 4, and May 5, 2017, Pvris performed in London as a part of their European tour and previewed the song "Half" for the first time as a part of their new album. The song was later released as the first promotional single from the album on July 14, 2017. On May 1, All We Know of Heaven, All We Need of Hell was initially announced for release on August 4. However, on July 18, the release was pushed back to August 25 due to "last minute production tweaks". "Winter" was subsequently released on August 3, 2017, as the second promotional single. The title of the album was likely influenced or derived from the last lines of the Emily Dickinson poem, "My life closed twice before its close".

Singles
On April 30, 2017, Pvris premiered the single "Heaven" from the album on BBC's Radio 1 Rock Show.

On June 13, Pvris premiered "What's Wrong" on Annie Mac's BBC Radio 1 show as the second single from the album. The track topped the Kerrang! Rock Chart and spent several further weeks in the top 20.

On July 14, Pvris released a promotional single from the album, "Half", along with a visualette found on YouTube.

On August 3, Pvris released another promotional single, "Winter", with another visualette, promoted on social media.

On August 23, Pvris released the third single of their album “Anyone Else” by promoting it on their social media.

On December 15, Pvris released a radio edit of "Same Soul" as the fourth single from the album.

Reception

All We Know of Heaven, All We Need of Hell received critical acclaim from music critics. At review aggregate site Metacritic, the album has an average score of 86 out of 100, based on 7 reviews, indicating "universal acclaim". Before release, Alternative Press included the album on their list of the most anticipated albums of the year. George Garner of Q said the album "marks an intensification of that latent darkness and musical expansiveness" as heard on White Noise.

Track listing
Track listing per booklet.

Personnel
Personnel per booklet.

Pvris
 Lynn Gunn – vocals, guitar, drums, percussion, piano, organ, programming, additional production
 Brian MacDonald – bass
 Alex Babinski – guitar

Additional musicians
 Chris Kamrada – drums, percussion
 Mikaela Davis – harp
 Blake Harnage – synthesizers, programming

Design
 Taylor Bringuel – creative direction
 Lynn Gunn – creative direction, layout, design
 Randall Leddy – layout, design
 Andi Elloway – front cover photo, composite

Production and design
 Blake Harnage – producer, engineer
 Mark "Spike" Stent – mixing (tracks 1, 2, 4 and 7)
 Michael Freeman – assistant
 Rich Costey – mixing (tracks 3, 5, 8, 9 and 10)
 Jeff Juliano – mixing (track 6)
 Chris Athens – mastering
 Anthony Reeder – engineer, editing
 Jef Moll – drum engineer
 Jarrod Fallon – drum technician
 John Colangelo – drum technician

Charts

References
Citations

Sources

 
 

2017 albums
Pvris albums
Rise Records albums
BMG Rights Management albums